The Campeche (or butaca, as it is called in Spanish) is a reclining, non-folding, sling-seat chair with a distinctive side-placed curule base. In North America, they are named for the Campeche region of Mexico's Yucatán Peninsula, and were popular in the Americas during the early nineteenth century. Similar versions of the form are found throughout Europe, such as the Schinkel writing chair at Schloss Charlottenburg in Berlin. Other related forms include the "planter's chair" or "bootjack" (that bears folding arms that extend outward as leg rests) which is associated with equatorial climes and plantation-based societies.

History 

This chair form, essentially an X-frame, is associated with the Americas where it is used most widely. Examples are embellished in keeping with regional tastes and carved or brass finials, tooled leather seats, and ornate inlay work are regular features. Decorative aspects such as guadamecil found on historic examples in Mexico directly relate to Ibero-Roman aesthetic development.

The majority of scholarship on the Campeche chair is by Metropolitan Museum of Art historian Cybèle Gontar, documenting hundreds of examples, considering associated terminology, bringing to light the popularity of what were called "Spanish" chairs throughout the New Republic, and showing that they were not limited to the American South. Gontar traces the form to the Iberian peninsula and indicates that, while the butaca is a "new chair for a new world," European precedents cannot be ignored. Campeche chairs were originally upholstered in embossed leather or cane, though also came to be padded with fabric.

Thomas Jefferson, who received a pair of such chairs in August 1819 from Louisiana representative Thomas Bolling Robertson, referred to them in his correspondence as "Campeachy" or "Siesta" chairs, signifying his understanding of their Mexican origin and their informal use. At least one replica was made by the enslaved Monticello cabinetmaker John Hemings. Thomas Jefferson Foundation historians Robert Self, Sumpter Priddy, and Diane Ehrenpreis have further examined the Monticello chairs and their origins.

Design 

The Campeche chair design is generally linked with the ancient X-frame, sella curulis, and "campaign" furniture. Gontar has emphasized the chair's relation to the European curule (also "Savonorola" and sillón de cadera) and has defined its cultural and artistic significance as follows:

Gontar claims that Mies van der Rohe's famed MR90 Barcelona chair design for the Barcelona Pavilion may have been inspired by 20th century Mexican or Spanish examples, such as those by Luis Barragán, who promoted the butaca. Clara Porset, a Mexican-based designer of Cuban origin, emphasized the egalitarian use of the butaca and its native origins, though Gontar has considered the relevance of European joinery methods in the chair's invention. "Winged" examples, kept in the Museo de Arte Colonial in Havana are locally attributed to "Campechanos," who traveled there from the Yucatán.

Important historic Campeches are found in several North American museums and private collections. Clara Porset's butaca designs have been exhibited several times at the Museum of Modern Art in New York City and Museo Franz Mayer in Mexico City.

Examples 
http://www.themagazineantiques.com/articles/the-american-campeche- chair/ For many examples of Campeche chairs see Gontar in Furnishing Louisiana: Creole and Acadian Furniture, 1735–1835, The Historic New Orleans Collection, 2010.

References 

Chairs
Arts in Mexico